Defending champion Gabriela Sabatini defeated Monica Seles in the final, 7–5, 6–4 to win the women's singles tennis title at the 1992 Italian Open.

Seeds
The first eight seeds received a bye to the second round.

Draw

Finals

Top half

Section 1

Section 2

Bottom half

Section 3

Section 4

References

External links
 Official results archive (ITF)
 Official results archive (WTA)

Women's Singles
1992 WTA Tour